Bush Family Fortunes: The Best Democracy Money Can Buy is a 2004 documentary film directed by Steven Grandison and Greg Palast. The film, which examines various aspects of the Presidency of George W. Bush, including the 2000 US Presidential election and the Iraq War, is adapted from the 2003 BBC production Bush Family Fortunes and based on the 2002 book The Best Democracy Money Can Buy by investigative journalist Palast, who had spent years tracking the Bush family for the BBC and The Guardian newspaper. The research for the original BBC film, which claims to have exposed the George W. Bush military service controversy, was also drawn upon by Michael Moore for Fahrenheit 9/11 (2004) and footage was used by Robert Greenwald in Unprecedented: The 2000 Presidential Election (2002).

Synopsis
Pre-title footage from presenter Greg Palast's cut-off interview with Florida Director of Elections Clayton Roberts, who exits the room, opens the movie.

The war hero
Palast introduces George W. Bush with particular reference to his popular image as a war hero cemented in the public mind by his landing on the aircraft carrier  for the 2003 Mission Accomplished Speech. He introduces authentic former Navy fighter pilot [[Charles W. ["Bill"] White]] who exposes W. Bush's attempted reenactment of Tom Cruise's Top Gun carrier landing following a heroic Mig shootdown as the pathetic publicity stunt that it was.  Palast goes on to allege that Bush used his father's influence to gain a draft-dodging placement with the Texas Air National Guard which he subsequently failed to serve.

The candidate
Palast picks up the story with Bush's 2000 US Presidential Election campaign where he claims Florida Governor Jeb Bush and Florida Secretary of State Katherine Harris used their influence to purge and discount the ballots of predominantly Gore-supporting black voters through the “fake felons list” compiled by private company DBT/ChoicePoint for US$4 million.

The money
Palast goes on to examine the corporate donors to Bush's election campaign, such as Enron CEO Ken Lay, who as members of Bush's pioneer network contributed huge sums through family and friends, and who he claims subsequently profited from the Bush presidency with senior government appointments, no-bid contracts, executive orders and deregulation.

The oil
Palast outlines what he refers to as the Bush-cycle, where Bush family members use money to gain political office and then use the office to gain even more money, dating back to Senator Prescott Bush who funded the family's entry into the oil business, citing the example of Bush's Harken Energy winning a contract to drill in the Persian Gulf thanks he alleges to Bush Snr's presidency.

The connection
Palast alleges that both prior to and since the September 11 attacks Bush has blocked investigations into members of the Bin Laden family and other rich Saudis, who are alleged to have provided funding to Al Qaeda and which have long been funnelling money into Bush family business ventures via businessman James R. Bath, who was a part owner of Bush's failed Arbusto Energy.  Navy fighter pilot [[Charles W. ["Bill"] White]], who was Bath's business partner and close confidant during the decade of the 1980s, is revealed to be the source who first disclosed Bath's tax returns and personal financial statements showing that Bath was awarded a 5% ownership interest in W. Bush's Arbusto in lieu of a cash commission for having funneled BinLaden money to Bush.

The Plan: Iraq
Palast concludes with Bush's declaration of the Iraq War, which he claims was made to fulfil a long planned strategy, drawn up at the beginning of Bush's presidency, to divide and sell up all of Iraq's assets, especially the oil, to the Bush family's corporate donors against the interests of the Iraqi people and their democratic ambitions.

Errors
At 10:57 mention is made of picking up records at Camp Mabry in Houston.  Camp Mabry is actually located in Austin.

Participants
 Clayton Roberts – Director of Elections, Florida
 Jim Hightower – Former Texas Agriculture Commissioner
 Charles W. ["Bill"] White – Former Navy Fighter Pilot and Bath's longtime business partner
 Terry Johnson – Bush's College Roommate
 Robert Dieter – Bush's College Roommate
 Bill Burkett – Retired Lt. Col., Texas Air Guard
 Willie Steen – Florida Voter
 Pam Iorio – Election Supervisor, Tampa, Florida
 Craig McDonald – Texans for Public Justice
 Andrea & Dean McWilliams – Bush/Enron Lobbyists
 Nick Kralj – Democratic Lobbyist
 Wayne Madsen – author
 Pete Brewton – investigative journalist 
 David Rosen – Oilman
 Stephen Push – Families of September 11
 Ron Motley – Lawyer
 General Jay Garner
 Grover Norquist – Lobbyist

See also
 Unprecedented: The 2000 Presidential Election (2002)
 Fahrenheit 9/11 (2004)
 Big Easy to Big Empty (2007)

References

External links
  for Greg Palast
 
 

2004 films
2004 documentary films
American documentary films
American independent films
Documentary films about presidents of the United States
Documentary films about elections in the United States
Films about the 2000 United States presidential election
Documentary films about the September 11 attacks
Documentary films about the Iraq War
Films about George W. Bush
Greg Palast
2000s English-language films
2000s American films